IEL may refer to:

Industrial Estates Limited, Canadian company
Industrial Equity Limited, Australian company
Institute for Extended Learning, a school in Spokane, Washington
Intraepithelial lymphocyte, cells of GALT
Istanbul High School, Istanbul (Erkek) Lisesi, a highschool in Istanbul, Turkey
Intelligent Extraterrestrial Life, such as aliens.